Raj Kumar (born 2 March 1962 in Rajasthan state) is a former Indian track and field athlete. He won the bronze medal in 5000 meters in 1982 Asian Games and the silver medal in the event at the 1983 Asian Championships in Athletics. He is a former national record holder in 5000 meters with a time of 13.46.4 minutes.

He was awarded Arjuna Award in 1984.

References 

All-Athletics profile

1962 births
Living people
Indian male long-distance runners
Athletes from Rajasthan
Rajasthani people
Recipients of the Arjuna Award
Athletes (track and field) at the 1982 Asian Games
Asian Games medalists in athletics (track and field)
Athletes (track and field) at the 1982 Commonwealth Games
Asian Games bronze medalists for India
Medalists at the 1982 Asian Games
Commonwealth Games competitors for India